Riva Forni Electrici S.p.A. is a major Italian steel producer. Riva is a privately held company, the whole shareholders' equity being held by the Riva family.

History

Early history
Riva Acciaio was founded in 1954 in Milan by Adriano and Emilio Riva as an iron scrap trading business. In 1957, the first Riva Acciaio mini-mill was built in Caronno Pertusella near Saronno. A few years later, this plant became the first steelworks in Italy to use continuous casting, in partnership with steel plant engineer Danieli. In the 1960s, Riva expanded in Italy by purchasing smaller rivals.

1970s–1990s
Starting from the 1970s, Riva took part in the privatization process of the ailing European steel industry by making further acquisitions in European countries such as
 the previously state-owned steelworks Acciaierie di Cornigliano in Genoa,
 the Thy-Marcinelle plant in Charleroi Belgium, and
 the Alpa plant in Gargenville France.

In 1992, it acquired directly from the German Treuhandanstalt two important plants (Brandenburger Elektrostahlwerke and Henningsdorfer Elektrostahlwerke) in the former German Democratic Republic.

In 1995, Riva Acciaio purchased the ILVA plant in Taranto from the Italian government, becoming one of the main European steel producers.

Due to the important role played in the privatization of the European steel industry, Emilio Riva was awarded the Grand Cross of Merit by the King of Belgium (2000), the Grand Cross of Merit of the Federal Republic of Germany (2002) and the French Legion of Honour (2005). Étienne Davignon, former European Commissioner and Vice-president of the European Commission, has defined Emilio Riva as “prophet of this dynamic and optimistic vision of private enterprise”, affirming that “steelmaking is not an industry like the others, and the Riva group is not an industrial group like the others”.

Pollution at ILVA Taranto plant

On March 8, 2006, the Court of Cassation convicted Emilio Riva to 18 months granting conditional leniency, with regard to events occurred from December 1997 to November 1998 related to an attempted illegal coercion of some ILVA employees which Emilio Riva had been charged with others.

On June 16, 2010, the Court of Cassation declared the extinction because of the statute of limitations of all the violations which Emilio Riva, among others, had been charged with, as to the events occurred from July 2000 to September 2002 related to the supposed violation of anti-pollution regulations in the management of the Ilva factory of Taranto.

Pollution at Genoa plant

On January 19, 2009, the Court of Appeal of Genoa declared null and void the first instance's verdict related to the charge of pollution and declared the extinction because of the statute of limitations of the other minor charges which Emilio Riva and two of his sons had been charged with in the management of the Ilva factory of Genoa, with regard to events occurred from 1995 to 2002 related to the violation of anti-pollution regulations.

Ilva scandal

On February 2, 2012, a report by Istituto Superiore di Sanità revealed extreme levels of air pollution and an abnormal incidence of cancer and cardiovascular diseases around the city of Taranto, where the ILVA giant steelworks are located. Following the report, Emilio Riva and his son Nicola, along with Taranto plant top managers, were arrested for allegedly causing an environmental disaster, and the plant was seized. However, the resulting Ambiente Svenduto (Italian for "environment undersold") trial has been mostly inconclusive. Emilio Riva died in 2014, aged 87, while his brother Adriano Riva, that succeeded Emilio at the top of the family business after the scandal, died in 2019, aged 88, after having reached a €1.3 billion settlement with the Italian state.

On 24 April 2018 another son of founder Emilio, Fabio Riva ex-deputy of Riva Group, was convicted for fraud and sentenced to 6 years and 3 months in jail.

In May 2018 the Italian state, which had escheated ILVA by the ruckus, now sold the Taranto plant to ArcelorMittal for 1.8 billion. Also included in the transaction were the Genoa steelworks and the Novi Ligure steelworks.

On 31 May 2021 the former owners of the Ilva steelworks, Fabio and Nicola Riva, were sentenced to 22 and 20 years in jail respectively for allowing it to spew out deadly pollution. Several other people were also sentenced, including former President of Apulia Nichi Vendola to 3.5 years in prison.

See also
 List of steel producers
Ilva (company)
Thy-Marcinelle, Belgian subsidiary
History of the Riva Group since 1954
Official web site Ilva Taranto plant
Official web site School project Ilva Taranto
Official web site Centro Studi Ilva Taranto

Further reading 
 Margherita Balconi, La siderurgia italiana 1945-1990: tra sostegno pubblico ed incentivi del mercato, Bologna, Il Mulino, 1990—
 Le privatizzazioni in Italia, Milan, Mediobanca Ricerche e Studi, 2000—

References

Steel companies of Italy
Multinational companies headquartered in Italy
Manufacturing companies based in Milan
Manufacturing companies established in 1954
Italian companies established in 1954
Italian brands
Caronno Pertusella